The South American coati (Nasua nasua), also known as the ring-tailed coati, is a coati species and a member of the raccoon family (Procyonidae), found in the tropical and subtropical parts of South America. Its color is highly variable and the rings on the tail may be only somewhat visible, but its most distinguishing characteristic is that it lacks the largely white snout (or "nose") of its northern relative, the white-nosed coati.

Distribution and habitat

The South American coati is widespread in tropical and subtropical South America.
Nasua nasua occupancy is significantly and negatively related to elevation but positively related to forest cover.

It has been recorded in west Ecuador, and north and west Colombia. In Argentina, it has been recorded in Santa Fe and Salta Provinces.

The only documented records of white-nosed coati in South America are from far northwestern Colombia, in the Gulf of Urabá region, near Colombian border with Panama. The smaller mountain coati lives foremost at altitudes above the South American coati, but there is considerable overlap.

It has been introduced and naturalized in the island of Mallorca, where it is considered an invasive species.

Invasiveness 
In Europe, this species is included since 2016 in the list of Invasive Alien Species of Union concern (the Union list). This implies that this species cannot be imported, bred, transported, commercialized, or intentionally released into the environment in the whole of the European Union.

Behavior

South American coatis are diurnal animals, and live both on the ground and in trees. They are omnivorous, but primarily eat fruit, invertebrates, other small animals and bird eggs. They search for fruit in trees high in the canopy, and use their snouts to poke through crevices to find animal prey on the ground. They also search for animal prey by turning over rocks on the ground or ripping open logs with their claws.

Females typically live in large groups, called bands, consisting of 15 to 30 animals. Males are usually solitary. Solitary males were originally considered a separate species due to the different social habits and were called "coatimundis", a term still sometimes used today. Neither bands of females nor solitary males defend a unique territory, and territories therefore overlap.

Group members can produce soft whining sounds, but alarm calls are different, consisting of loud woofs and clicks. Coatis typically sleep in the trees. When an alarm call is sounded, they climb trees, and then drop down to the ground and disperse. Predators of the South American coati include foxes, jaguars, jaguarundis, and occasionally humans.

Reproduction

All females in a group come into heat simultaneously when fruit is in season and mate with several males. Gestation period is 74 to 77 days. Captive females give birth to 1–7 young at a time. In the wild, they leave the group for giving birth in a nest built in trees, and rejoin the group with their offspring 5–6 weeks later. They usually remain with their natal group. Males generally disperse from their natal group at the age of three years. South American coatis generally live for up to 7 years in the wild, but can live up to 14 years in captivity.

Taxonomy
Viverra nasua was the scientific name proposed by Carl Linnaeus in 1766 for a red coati specimen. It was subordinated to the genus Nasua. As of 2005, 13 subspecies were recognized:

 N. n. nasua 
 N. n. spadicea 
 N. n. solitaria 
 N. n. vittata 
 N. n. montana 
 N. n. dorsalis 
 N. n. molaris 
 N. n. manium 
 N. n. candace 
 N. n. quichua 
 N. n. cinerascens 
 N. n. aricana y
 N. n. boliviensis

References

Procyonidae
Carnivorans of South America
Mammals of Argentina
Mammals of Bolivia
Mammals of Brazil
Mammals of Colombia
Mammals of Ecuador
Mammals of French Guiana
Mammals of Guyana
Mammals of Paraguay
Mammals of Peru
Mammals of Suriname
Mammals of Uruguay
Mammals of Venezuela
Fauna of the Amazon
Least concern biota of South America
Mammals described in 1766
Taxa named by Carl Linnaeus